Zebrasoma is a genus of surgeonfishes native to the Indian and Pacific Oceans. They have disc-shaped bodies and sail-like fins.

Species
There are currently seven recognized species in this genus:
 Zebrasoma desjardinii (E. T. Bennett, 1836) -  Desjardin's sailfin tang
 Zebrasoma flavescens (E. T. Bennett, 1828) - yellow tang
 Zebrasoma gemmatum (Valenciennes, 1835) - gem tang
 Zebrasoma rostratum (Günther, 1875) - black tang
 Zebrasoma scopas (G. Cuvier, 1829) - scopas tang
 Zebrasoma velifer (Bloch, 1795) - sailfin tang
 Zebrasoma xanthurum (Blyth, 1852) - purple tang

References

External links
Fishwatcher's Guide - Zebrasoma

Acanthuridae
Venomous fish
Marine fish genera
Taxa named by William John Swainson